Bernard Schmitt may refer to:
* Bernard Schmitt (economist) (1929–2014), French economist
 Bernard Schmitt (director), French director, e.g. of Pacific Palisades
 Bernard William Schmitt (1928–2011), American prelate of the Roman Catholic Church, Bishop of Wheeling-Charleston 1989-2004